The Leader (formerly The Wrexham Evening Leader) is a daily newspaper in Wales which is distributed on weekday mornings, combining both local and national news.

There are two Leader editions in the north-east of Wales: in Wrexham and Flintshire with the Chester edition being terminated in 2018.

It costs 70 pence and is produced from an office in Mold. It was sold to Gannett by NWN Media in September 2017. NWN Media Ltd dissolved in January 2019 after being formed in 1920. JICREG data from November 2015 show a circulation of 2,567 in Wrexham and 1,935 in Wrexham Rural. NWN titles de-registered from ABC measurement in 2015 however Newsquest re-registered them in 2018 showing a drop in circulation to just 3,825 copies of the Wrexham edition and 2,445 copies for Flintshire.

The Leader celebrated 40 years of publishing in October 2013, having launched the first edition in October 1973.

A Wrexham Leader free edition used to be produced for Friday and Saturday delivery however was terminated in 2018, and the Wrexham office of the newspaper closed in December 2018.

On 3 April 2006, The Leader underwent a style change, and changed its logo to a new, more modern style. The old font and style had been used since the newspaper began.

From 14 September 2009, the paper shifted from being an evening paper called The Evening Leader to a morning paper entitled The Leader and adopted the current masthead.

The Saturday Leader was launched as a Saturday edition of the newspaper on 4 August 2018. however was stopped in December 2019.

References

External links
The Leader's website

Newspapers published in Wales
Wrexham
Newspapers published in Cheshire
Daily newspapers published in the United Kingdom
1973 establishments in Wales
Publications established in 1973